Halimium lasianthum, the Lisbon false sun-rose or woolly rock rose, is a species of flowering plant in the family Cistaceae, native to the Iberian Peninsula (Portugal, western Spain and southwestern France) and Northwest Africa (Morocco). The flowers may have a maroon blotch at the base of each petal.

In cultivation this plant requires a sandy soil and full sun.

References

lasianthum
Flora of Portugal
Flora of Spain
Endemic flora of the Iberian Peninsula